Bashir Mohammed Ali Al-Hashimi, CBE, FREng, FIEEE, FIET, FBCS (born 5 January 1961) is the Vice Principal (Research & Innovation) and ARM Professor of Computer Engineering at King's College London in the United Kingdom.  He served previously as Executive Dean of the Faculty of Natural, Mathematical & Engineering Sciences at King's  and as Executive Dean of the Faculty of Engineering and Physical Sciences at University of Southampton, where he is a Visiting Professor at the School of Electronics and Computer Science (ECS). He is also an Elected Trustee of the Royal Academy of Engineering Board. He was the co-founder and co-director of the ARM-ECS Research Centre, which is an industry-university collaborative centre involving the University of Southampton and ARM. He served as a panel member on the UK Research Excellence Framework (REF) 2014 and the REF 2021 Engineering Panel. In 2023, UKRI announced he will be joining the Expanding Excellence in England (E3) Fund Assessment Panel. His research focuses on understanding the interaction between hardware and software in constrained computing systems such as in mobile and embedded applications and how such interactions can be used through theory and experiment to achieve systems energy efficiency and enhanced hardware dependability. He has made fundamental theoretical and experimental contributions to the field of hardware-software co-design, low-power test and test-data compression of digital integrated circuits, and the emerging field of energy-harvesting computing.

Major projects 
Al-Hashimi was lead director on PRiME, a £5.6 million EPSRC funded five-year programme (2013–2018) researching in the areas of low-power, highly-parallel, reconfigurable and dependable computing and verified software design.

He is also the project director and principal investigator for a £1.6 million project aiming to develop ultra-energy-efficient electronic systems for emerging applications including mobile digital health, and autonomous wireless monitoring in environmental and industrial settings. This project addressed one of the UK Electronics Design community Grand Challenges, “Batteries Not Included”. The funding of this project has played an important role in shaping and influencing the academic research agenda world-wide in powering Internet of Things devices in a sustainable way.

Awards 
Al-Hashimi was appointed Commander of the Order of the British Empire (CBE) in the 2018 Queen's Birthday Honours for services to computer engineering and to industry.

In 2014, he received the Royal Society Wolfson Fellowship for his work on Energy-efficient and reliable many-core computing systems.

In 2012, he was awarded the Outstanding Service Award by the IEEE Council for Electronic Design Automation (CEDA) for serving as the General Chair of DATE 2012.

In 2020, he was awarded the IET Faraday Medal, formally signing the register at a ceremony in October 2022.

Editorships 
Editor-in-Chief of IET Computers & Digital Techniques.

Fellowships and Memberships 
Fellow of the Royal Academy of Engineering, 2013.

Fellow of the Institute of Electrical and Electronics Engineers, 2009.

In 2012, the European Electronic Design Automation Association awarded him a DATE Fellowship for leadership and outstanding contributions to electronic design, automation and test.

In 2023, he was elected as a member of the European Academy of Sciences and Arts.

Personal life 
He is married to May and they have three daughters: Sara, Haneen and Zahara.

References 

Living people
1961 births
Academics of the University of Southampton
Arm Holdings people
Fellows of the Institute of Engineering and Technology
Fellows of the Royal Academy of Engineering